Test Valley School is a comprehensive secondary school with Specialist Status in Mathematics and Computing located in Stockbridge, Hampshire, England.

Due to its rural location, it has a wide catchment area, with significant numbers of students travelling from Andover, Salisbury, Romsey, The Wallops and other small villages near to Stockbridge.

Exam Results
5 GCSEs at A*-C: 64% (2012)

5 GCSEs at A*-C: 69% (2014) 

5 GCSEs at A*-C: 67% (2015) 

In 2018, 57% of pupils achieved 5 or more 9-4 grades, compared to a 60% national average. 38% of pupils achieved grade 5 (a strong pass) in both maths and English, compared to a 40% national average.

References

OFSTED Report
Head prefects faith Colborne and Archie Goddard

External links

Secondary schools in Hampshire
Community schools in Hampshire
Stockbridge, Hampshire